The Buhl CA-1 Airster was a sports airplane developed in the United States in 1930. It was a conventional low-wing cantilever monoplane with fixed tailwheel undercarriage and an open cockpit for the pilot.

The CA-1 was designed for air-racing and for use as a mail plane.  No market was found for the aircraft and only the single prototype was ever constructed.

A two-seat variant was developed with a second open cockpit in tandem with the pilot's and with a Townend ring and wheel spats, but this didn't sell either.

Versions 
CA-1 Airster (1930)
300 hp Wright J-6
one built
CA-1WA Airster (1930)
420 hp P&W Wasp
one built

See also

References

 
 aerofiles.com

CA-001
1930s United States sport aircraft
Racing aircraft
Low-wing aircraft
Single-engined tractor aircraft
Aircraft first flown in 1930